The Gordon A. McKay Award is an annual prize given by the Meteoritical Society to the student who gives the best oral presentation at its annual meeting. This award honors the memory of Gordon A. McKay (1945–2008), a NASA planetary scientist specializing in lunar and Martian geochemistry. It was established in 2008 and comes with a prize of $1,000 and a certificate.

Gordon A. McKay Award Winners
Source: Previous Winners, Meteoritical Society

See also

 Glossary of meteoritics
 List of astronomy awards
 List of prizes named after people

References

Astronomy prizes
Meteorite prizes
American awards
Awards established in 2008